Habronyx is a genus of parasitoid wasps belonging to the family Ichneumonidae. The species of this genus are found in Europe, Australia, and North and South America.

Distribution 
Habronyx species are found in most realms, with the exception of the Afrotropical realm.

Reproduction 
Habronyx adults lay their eggs inside Lepidopteran larvae (i.e. caterpillars) by piercing them with their ovipositor. Habronyx eggs consist of an equatorial disc and a caudal stalk, making them look a bit like the cartoon oil lamp from Aladdin. It's thought that the shape is adapted to attach the egg to the inside of the caterpillar's integument. Once the eggs hatch, the Habronyx larvae consume the caterpillar from the inside. They emerge from the deceased caterpillar as adults.

Description 

The adult of most Habronyx species are generally about 30mm in length. 

Like all ichneumons, the genitals of the male Habronyx consists of a capsule formed by two lateral gonosquamae. The membraneous part of the aedeagus is covered in small spines; Habryonx shares this feature with several other genera but some genera have a smooth aedeagus .

Species 

 Habronyx aclerivorus (Rohwer, 1915) 
 Habronyx albifrons (Spinola, 1851)
 Habronyx amoenus Dasch, 1984 
 Habronyx ariasae Gauld & Bradshaw, 1997 
 Habronyx atropos Gauld, 1976 
 Habronyx australasiae (Morley, 1913) 
 Habronyx baibarense (Uchida, 1928) 
 Habronyx baibarensis (Uchida, 1928) 
 Habronyx carmonai Gauld & Bradshaw, 1997 
 Habronyx citrinus Porter, 2007 
 Habronyx clothos Gauld, 1976 
 Habronyx coarctatus (Ashmead, 1900) 
 Habronyx columbianus Dasch, 1984 
 Habronyx discoidellus (Sonan, 1930) 
 Habronyx edwardsii (Cresson, 1879) 
 Habronyx elegans (Shestakov, 1923) 
 Habronyx flavistigma Davis, 1898 Habronyx flavus (Alvarado, 2015)  (subgenus Camposcopus) Habronyx foveolatus Dasch, 1984 
 Habronyx fulvipes (Townes, Momoi & Townes, 1965) - taxon renamed from Habronyx Chinesis (Uchida 1955) 
 Habronyx heros (Wesmael, 1849) 
 Habronyx insidiator (Smith, 1874) 
 Habronyx lachesis Gauld, 1976 
 Habronyx latens (Brues, 1910) 
 Habronyx limbatus Dasch, 1984  Habronyx luteopectus (Norton, 1863) 
 Habronyx magniceps (Cresson, 1872) 
 Habronyx majorocellus Wang, 1989 
 Habronyx minutus Ward, 2015 
 Habronyx neomexicanus Dasch, 1984  Habronyx nigricornis (Wesmael, 1849) 
 Habronyx nigrifrons (Alvarado, 2015)  subgenus Habronyx
 Habronyx oregonus Dasch, 1984 
 Habronyx pammi Gauld, 1976 
 Habronyx peltatus Dasch, 1984 
 Habronyx perspicuus (Wesmael, 1849) 
 Habronyx perturbans (Morley, 1913) 
 Habronyx punensis Porter, 2007 
 Habronyx pyretorum (Cameron, 1912) 
 Habronyx regalis (Morley, 1913) 
 Habronyx robustus (Morley, 1913) 
 Habronyx saqsaywaman (Alvarado, 2015)  subgenus Habronyx
 Habronyx severini Dasch, 1984 
 Habronyx sonani (Uchida, 1958) 
 Habronyx subinsidiator Wang, 1985 
 Habronyx sulcator (Morley, 1913) 
 Habronyx tonnaiensis (Uchida, 1929) 
 Habronyx trilineatus (Cameron, 1906) 
 Habronyx victorianus'' (Morley, 1913)

References

Ichneumonidae
Ichneumonidae genera